Marcel Granollers and Marc López defeated Mahesh Bhupathi and Rohan Bopanna in the final, 7–5, 3–6, [10–3] to win the doubles tennis title at the 2012 ATP World Tour Finals.

Max Mirnyi and Daniel Nestor were the defending champions, but were eliminated in the round-robin stage.

Seeds

Draw

Finals

Group A
Standings are determined by: 1. number of wins; 2. number of matches; 3. in two-players-ties, head-to-head records; 4. in three-players-ties, percentage of sets won, or of games won; 5. steering-committee decision.

Group B
Standings are determined by: 1. number of wins; 2. number of matches; 3. in two-players-ties, head-to-head records; 4. in three-players-ties, percentage of sets won, or of games won; 5. steering-committee decision.

References

External links
Main Draw

Doubles

fr:ATP World Tour Finals 2012#Double